Cuhnești is a commune in Glodeni District, Moldova. It is composed of five villages: Bisericani, Cot, Cuhnești, Movileni and Serghieni.

References

Communes of Glodeni District